Hitchin Town Football Club is an English semi-professional football club based in Hitchin, Hertfordshire. They compete in the Southern Football League's Premier Division. Founded in 1928 and known as "The Canaries", Hitchin Town have been based at Top Field since their foundation.

Key

Top scorer and number of goals scored shown in bold when he was also top scorer for the division.

Key to league record
 Lvl = Level of the league in the current league system
 S = Numbers of seasons
 Pld = Games played
 W = Games won
 D = Games drawn
 L = Games lost
 GF = Goals for
 GA = Goals against
 GD = Goals difference
 Pts = Points
 Position = Position in the final league table
 Overall position = Overall club position in the English league system

Key to cup records
 Res = Final reached round
 Rec = Final club record in the form of wins-draws-losses
 PR = Premilinary round
 QR1 = Qualifying round 1
 QR2 = Qualifying round 2
 QR3 = Qualifying round 3
 QR4 = Qualifying round 4
 R1 = Round 1
 R2 = Round 2
 R3 = Round 3
 R4 = Round 4
 R5 = Round 5
 R6 = Round 6
 QF = Quarter-finals
 SF = Semi-finals
 RU = Runners-up
 W = Winners

 Average home attendance = for league games only

Seasons

References

Hitchin Town F.C.
Hitchin Town F.C.